The International Ornithological Congress (IOC) recognizes these 42 species of cormorants and shags which are distributed among seven genera. One species, spectacled cormorant (formerly called Pallas's cormorant), is extinct.

This list is presented according to the IOC taxonomic sequence and can also be sorted alphabetically by common name and binomial.

References

Cormorants
Cormorant